Arturo Villanueva (17 January 1896 – 11 September 1980) was a Mexican sports shooter. He competed in the 25 m rapid fire pistol event at the 1932 Summer Olympics.

References

External links
 

1896 births
1980 deaths
Mexican male sport shooters
Olympic shooters of Mexico
Shooters at the 1932 Summer Olympics
Place of birth missing